The 2002–03 CA Osasuna season is the 82nd season in the club's history.in the La Liga.

Review

June

July

August

September

October

November

December

January

February

March

April

May
Osasuna finished the season in 11th position in the La Liga table. In other competitions, Osasuna reached the semifinals of the Copa del Rey.

John Aloisi was the top scorer for Osasuna with 8 goals in all competitions.

Players and staff

Squad information

Transfer in

Transfer out

Technical staff

Kits
Osasuna's kit was manufactured by Spanish sports retailer Astore and sponsored by Caja Navarra.

Evens

Top goalscorer

Minutes played

Bookings

Friendlies

Competitions

Overall record

La Liga

League table

Squad

Copa del Rey

External links

Osasuna